Dardano Sacchetti (born 1944 ) is an Italian screenwriter who often worked with Italian directors Lamberto Bava and Lucio Fulci.

Screenwriting
Sacchetti was born in 1944,in Italy. His first screen credit was for Dario Argento's film The Cat o' Nine Tails. He predominantly worked with Lucio Fulci and Lamberto Bava.

He has worked with several television film projects with Lamberto Bava in the later half of the 1980s. Sacchetti stated that for his screenplays, he would only learn who the director would be a week before the film went into production.

Producers such as De Angelis would come to him and ask him to write two to five lines for a film in various genres such as adventure films, westerns and pornography. Following this posters would be made for the films. When Foreign production had found interest in his write-ups, he would state that De Angelis would phone him and tell him which of the stories he had potential to sell and to write the scripts immediately.

He has worked with several television film projects with Lamberto Bava in the later half of the 1980s. As of 2017, Sacchetti was still writing for film and television.

Partial filmography
Note: The films listed as N/A are not necessarily chronological.

Footnotes

Sources

External links

Italian screenwriters
Italian male screenwriters
1944 births
Living people
Writers from Rome